The Cucumbers are an American power pop band from New Jersey, founded in Hoboken in the early 1980s by husband-and-wife duo Jon Fried and Deena Shoshkes.

History
Fried and Shoshkes met in their freshman dorm at Brown University and first performed on campus, doing folk and jazz standards acoustically, two voices accompanied by Fried on guitar. They lived together and wrote songs together and, in the early 1980s, moved to Europe. Their first song, "My Boyfriend", became a hit on the college radio charts, leading to national tours, a couple of videos on MTV, and reviews in Rolling Stone and People. They have been the subject of profiles in the New York Times, specifically by Jon Pareles. In the early 1990s, Shoshkes and three other musicians—Alice Genese, David Cogswell, and Frank Giannini—formed Over the Moon, an alternative rock group making music aimed at children. They released one eponymous album and performed at rock clubs, churches, and other locations in Hoboken and New York City. According to Nj.com, "...with a second child on the way, lead singer Deena Shoshkes and guitarist Jon Fried moved from their musical roots of Hoboken to Millburn. A suburban house gave them more room to raise their new family. Although the Cucumbers stepped out from the limelight of the Jersey scene they had been part for many years, they never stopped making music." They have received praise from music critic Robert Christgau.

Discography

Albums
Who Betrays Me...And Other Happier Songs (1985) - Fake Doom Records
The Cucumbers (1987) - Profile Records
Where We Sleep Tonight (1994) - Zero Hour Records
Total Vegitility (1999) - Home Office Records
All Things to You (2004) - Fictitious Records
The Fake Doom Years (2016) - Life Force Records
The Desk Drawer Tapes (2021) - Life Force Records

Extended plays
The Cucumbers (1983) - Fake Doom Records
All Shook Up (1986) - Fake Doom Records

References

External links
Their official website
Their Myspace Page

American power pop groups
Musical groups from New Jersey
Brown University alumni
Profile Records artists
Zero Hour Records artists